Andrew Lord may refer to:

 Andrew Lord (ice hockey) (born 1985), Canadian ice hockey player
 Andrew Lord (artist) (born 1950), English artist based in New York